Antelope (known as Rajneesh from 1984 to 1986) is a town in rural Wasco County, Oregon, United States.  Antelope had an estimated population of 47 people in 2012.

Overview
Antelope was originally a stage and freight wagon road stop on the old Dalles to Canyon City Trail.  Howard Maupin came to Antelope in 1863 to operate a horse ranch, becoming the caretaker of the stage station that was established by Henry Wheeler. Maupin began raising cattle to provide meat for travelers.  Nathan Wallace, who is sometimes credited with being Antelope's first postmaster, acquired the Antelope stage station from Maupin in 1870. Records indicate the community was considered to have been established in 1872. The town was incorporated as the City of Antelope in 1901.

In the early 1980s, hundreds of members of the Rajneesh movement moved in and built a small city in previously unoccupied land they purchased. The Rajneeshees effectively took over the government of the city by outnumbering the original residents with new voter registrations. On September 18, 1984, a vote was held, and the city was renamed Rajneesh, Oregon. By 1985, after several of the Rajneesh movement leaders were discovered to have been involved in criminal behavior (including a mass food poisoning attack and an aborted plot to assassinate a U.S. Attorney), leader Rajneesh left the country as part of a plea deal for federal immigration fraud charges, and the Rajneesh commune collapsed. On November 6, 1985, the city voted to revert to the name Antelope.

History
The Antelope Valley was probably named by European-American members of Joseph Sherar's party, who were packing supplies to mines in the John Day area. Sherar became known as the operator of a toll bridge across the Deschutes River, on a cut-off of the Barlow Road. In the early 19th century, the area supported many pronghorns, which are not true antelopes, but are often called "pronghorn antelopes".

18th century beginnings
In the mid-19th century, Antelope began as a station along the wagon road connecting The Dalles on the Columbia River with gold mines near Canyon City. After about 1870, the wagon road became known as The Dalles Military Road. The road crossed the Deschutes River on Sherar's Bridge.

The Antelope post office was established in 1871, with Howard Maupin, founder of Maupin, Oregon, as the first postmaster. The town's population peaked around 1900, shortly after the Columbia Southern Railway completed a  rail line from Biggs, on the Columbia River, to Shaniko, a few miles north of Antelope. The railroad timetable for September 9, 1900, lists a daily stagecoach run from the train terminal in Shaniko to Antelope and beyond. Antelope was incorporated by the Oregon Legislative Assembly on January 29, 1901.

Rajneesh movement takeover

Rajneeshpuram, a commune founded by the Rajneesh movement, was established near the town in 1981. On September 18, 1984, a vote was held and the city was renamed to "Rajneesh", after Rajneeshees registered to vote in Antelope en masse and took control of the council.

The organization collapsed in 1985 following the discovery by the authorities of criminal activities, such as the 1984 Rajneeshee bioterror attack. On November 6, 1985, the remaining residents, which included both original residents and some remaining Rajneeshees, voted 34 to 0 to restore the original name, and it was subsequently restored in 1986. The U.S. Postal Service had never recognized the change of name.

Subsequent to the collapse of the commune, the property reverted to ownership by the State of Oregon for non-payment of taxes, and was sold to Montana billionaire Dennis Washington in 1991 for $3.65 million. Currently, the ranch,  from Antelope, is operated by Young Life, a Christian parachurch organization, as a Christian youth camp known as "Washington Family Ranch".

The events of the mid-1980s that involved the city were the subject of the 2003 Forensic Files program "Bio Attack" and the 2018 Netflix documentary Wild Wild Country.

Geography

Antelope, in Wasco County in north-central Oregon, is along Oregon Route 218 just north of its intersection with Oregon Route 293. Antelope Creek, in the Deschutes River watershed, flows by Antelope.

Climate
According to the Köppen climate classification system, Antelope has a warm-summer Mediterranean climate (Köppen Csa).

Demographics

2010 census
As of the census of 2010, there were 46 people, 28 households, and 10 families residing in the city. The racial makeup of the city was 91.3% White (42 people), 2.2% Native American (1 person), 2.2% Asian (1 person), and 4.3% from two or more races (2 people).

There were 28 households, of which 11% (3 households) had children under the age of 18 living with them, 21% (6 households) were married couples living together, 4% (1 household) had a female householder with no husband present, 11% (3 households) had a male householder with no wife present, and 64% (18 households) were non-families. About 61% (17 households) of all households were made up of individuals, and 46% (13 households) had someone living alone who was 65 years of age or older. The average household size was 1.64 and the average family size was 2.70.

The median age in the city was 62 years. About 15% of residents (7 people) were under the age of 18; 2% (1 person) were between the ages of 18 and 24; 11% (5 people) were from 25 to 44; 30.3% (14 people) were from 45 to 64; and 41% (19 people) were 65 years of age or older. The gender makeup of the city was 52% (24 people) male and 48% (22 people) female.

References

Further reading

 Carl Abbott, "Utopia and Bureaucracy: The Fall of Rajneeshpuram, Oregon," Pacific Historical Review, vol. 59, no. 1 (Feb. 1990), pp. 77–103. In JSTOR
 Donna Quick, A Place Called Antelope: The Rajneesh Story (August Pr.), 1995.
 Arthur H. Campbell, Antelope: The Saga of a Western Town, 1990.

External links

Entry for Antelope from the Oregon Blue Book
Antelope, Oregon from a2zgorgeinfo.com (contains entire text of "Antelope" and "Rajneeshpuram" from Oregon Geographic Names)

Cities in Oregon
Cities in Wasco County, Oregon
Populated places established in 1871
Rajneesh movement
1871 establishments in Oregon